Atwima Mponua District is one of the forty-three districts in Ashanti Region, Ghana, and is the westernmost district in the Ashanti Region. Originally it was formerly part of the then-larger Atwima District in 1988; until part of the district was split off to create Atwima Mpouna District by a decree of president John Agyekum Kufuor on 12 November 2003 (effective 18 February 2004); while the remaining part has been renamed as Atwima Nwabiagya District (which it was elevated to municipal district assembly status on 15 March 2018 to become Atwima Nwabiagya Municipal District). The district assembly is located in the western part of Ashanti Region and has Nyinahin as its capital town.

Populated places 

 Tano Dumasi
 Hanneggar Village

References

Sources
 
 GhanaDistricts.com
 19 New Districts Created, GhanaWeb, November 20, 2003.

Districts of Ashanti Region